A Terrible Beauty (also known as The Night Fighters) is a 1960 drama film, directed by Tay Garnett and starring Robert Mitchum, Anne Heywood, Dan O'Herlihy and Richard Harris. It was adapted from a 1958 novel of the same name, written by Arthur Roth. It was an international co-production between the United Kingdom and Robert Mitchum's production company DRM.

Plot
Dermot O'Neill (Robert Mitchum) is recruited into the Irish Republican Army (IRA) when a unit is formed in his Northern Ireland town during the Second World War. Reaction to the news is mixed. His mother is strongly against it, while his father (Harry Brogan) is proud. His brother Ned (Niall MacGinnis) and sister Bella (Marianne Benet) are ambivalent. Dermot's girlfriend, Neeve Donnelly (Anne Heywood), breaks up with him, telling him the IRA will turn him into a murderer.

Dermot and his friend Sean Reilly (Richard Harris) are chosen from their unit to participate in a raid on a British armoury to steal weapons and ammunition. Don McGinnis (Dan O'Herlihy) is frustrated because, as commandant of the unit, he is too important to risk. The theft goes off without a hitch.

However, their next attack, to destroy a guarded power plant in concert with a planned German invasion, results in bloodshed. To get away, Dermot shoots a soldier blocking the way out. Sean is wounded in the foot and Johnny Corrigan is killed. Dermot and Sean evade their pursuers and manage to cross the border to safety in the Irish Free State. Dermot returns home, leaving his friend to recuperate.

Despite Dermot's advice to stay away, Sean tries to sneak back across the border and is captured by the police. Dermot wants to stage a rescue, but McGinnis turns him down. Sean is sentenced to ten years imprisonment.

McGinnis decides to get revenge by attacking a police barracks. Dermot opposes this plan, as a policeman's wife and children are living there, and warns that he will tell the authorities if McGinnis does not change his mind. When the commandant refuses to back down, Dermot tells McGinnis he is quitting the IRA. He is beaten up, but a police patrol comes upon the scene before the IRA members can do anything more drastic. Dermot carries through on his threat, telling Sergeant Crawley (Geoffrey Golden), though without naming names. He is abducted to stand trial as an informant.

Bella becomes concerned when her brother does not come home. She goes to Neeve. The two then consult Dermot's good friend, cobbler Jimmy Hannafin (Cyril Cusack). Jimmy has a pretty good idea what has happened. He gets Ned to help in the rescue. Neeve refuses to be left behind, but Bella is sent home to reassure her parents. Once they find and free Dermot, guarded only by youngster Quinn (Wilfred Downing), Jimmy arranges for a friend to give Dermot a ride to Belfast, where he can leave the country. Neeve goes with him.

Meanwhile, the IRA men start searching for him. McGinnis stations himself at the O'Neill home. In the darkness and driving rain, he mistakes the returning Bella (wearing Dermot's coat) for the fugitive and shoots her dead. He is horrified to discover that he has killed the woman he loves.

Cast

 Robert Mitchum as Dermot O'Neill
 Richard Harris as Sean Reilly
 Anne Heywood as Neeve Donnelly
 Dan O'Herlihy as Don McGinnis
 Cyril Cusack as Jimmy Hannafin
 Niall MacGinnis as Ned O'Neill
 Marianne Benet as Bella O'Neill
 Christopher Rhodes as Tim Malone
 Harry Brogan as Patrick O'Neill
 Eileen Crowe as Mrs. Kathleen O'Neill
 Joe Lynch as Seamus
 Marie Kean as Mrs. Matia Devlin
 Geoffrey Golden as Sergeant Crawley
 Edward Golden as Johnny Corrigan
 Wilfred Downing as Quinn

References

External links
 Film review at The New York Times
 
 
 
 

1960 films
1960 drama films
American black-and-white films
American drama films
1960s English-language films
Films about the Irish Republican Army
Films based on American novels
Films directed by Tay Garnett
Films set in 1941
Films set in Northern Ireland
Films shot in the Republic of Ireland
Films with screenplays by Robert Wright Campbell
United Artists films
American World War II films
1960s American films